The canton of Tergnier is an administrative division in northern France. At the French canton reorganisation which came into effect in March 2015, the canton was expanded from 4 to 24 communes:
 
Achery
Andelain
Anguilcourt-le-Sart
Beautor
Bertaucourt-Epourdon
Brie
Charmes
Courbes
Danizy
Deuillet
La Fère
Fourdrain
Fressancourt
Liez
Mayot
Mennessis
Monceau-lès-Leups
Rogécourt
Saint-Gobain
Saint-Nicolas-aux-Bois
Servais
Tergnier
Travecy
Versigny

Demographics

See also
Cantons of the Aisne department 
Communes of France

References

Cantons of Aisne